Michal Yannai (or Yanai, ; born 18 June 1972) is an Israeli actress.

Early and personal life 
Yannai was born and raised in Ramat Gan to a family of Jewish background.

In 2003, Yanai married Israeli businessman Ofer Resles. They divorced in 2005. She remarried in March 2009, to Israeli businessman Ben Muskal. In November 2009 their daughter Alex was born, and in December 2010, a son named Yahel. They have another son together named Yuval. As of 2021, they reside in Athens, Greece.

Career 

During the 1990s Yannai was a TV host and an actress on Arutz HaYeladim (the Israeli Children's Channel, "Arutz 6", ערוץ הילדים), where she was known as "The Children's Queen" (מלכת הילדים). During the 1990s Michal Yanai also hosted the show "Katzefet" on Arutz HaYeladim.

In 2007 she participated in the Israeli version of the stage show, Avenue Q, as a satire of herself.

Filmography 
Neshika Bametzach (The Day We Met, 1990) as Natalie
Pour Sacha (1991) as English girl #1
88 Minutes (2007) as Leeza Pearson
Mega Snake (2007) as Fay
When Nietzsche Wept (2007) as Bertha

See also 
Television of Israel
Theater of Israel

References

External links 

1972 births
Living people
Israeli film actresses
Israeli television actresses
People from Ramat Gan
Thelma Yellin High School of Arts alumni
Beit Zvi School for the Performing Arts alumni
Israeli Jews
Israeli emigrants to Greece
Jewish singers